Martin Mere is a mere near Burscough, in Lancashire, England, on the West Lancashire Coastal Plain.  The mere is a vast marsh, around  that was, until it was drained, the largest body of fresh water in England.

History
Martin Mere was formed at the end of the last ice age, when water filled a depression in the glacial drift. Since then its size has varied as water levels have risen and fallen. The original giant lake can be seen on Christopher Saxton's map from 1579 and stretched from Rufford in the east, to Churchtown (then known as North Meols) in the west. To the north of the lake were the villages of Mere Brow and Holmeswood, the site of Holmeswood Hall, built by the Heskeths as a hunting lodge. South of the lake was the Scarisbrick Hall estate, Martin Hall and Tarlefarwood, now known as Tarlscough.

The mere originally drained out in two places; at the western end the arm of the mere known as the Wyke drained into the Pool (or Old Pool) at what is now Crowland Street, Blowick, while at its eastern end it flowed into the river Douglas at Rufford. Active management of the mere began in 1692 when Thomas Fleetwood of Bank Hall cut a channel in an attempt to drain it. Further attempts to drain it were made in the 1780s, but effective drainage was achieved only in the mid-19th century, with the introduction of steam pumping.

Farms and market gardens were established on the rich soils of the reclaimed land. Between 1974 and 1982 sand from the former lake bed was quarried for use in glass-making at Mere Sands Wood which is now a nature reserve.

An ancient canoe has been excavated from Martin Mere and is on display in the Atkinson Art Gallery and Library.

Present
Part of the old mere is now the site of Martin Mere Wetland Centre, a wetland nature reserve managed by the Wildfowl and Wetlands Trust.

See also
 WWT Martin Mere

References 

Lakes of Lancashire
Geography of the Borough of West Lancashire
Ramsar sites in England
Burscough